The Rural Municipality of Livingston No. 331 is a rural municipality (RM) in the Canadian province of Saskatchewan within Census Division No. 9 and  Division No. 4.

History 
The RM of Livingston No. 331 incorporated as a rural municipality on January 1, 1913.

Geography

Communities and localities 
The following urban municipalities are surrounded by the RM.

Villages
 Arran

The following unincorporated communities are within the RM.

Localities
 Whitebeech

Demographics 

Attractions 
 Porcupine Hills
 Fort Livingston
 Fort Pelly

Government 
The RM of Livingston No. 331 is governed by an elected municipal council and an appointed administrator that meets on the second Wednesday of every month. The reeve of the RM is Linda Bourque while its administrator is Kelly Kim Rea. The RM's office is located in Arran.

Transportation 
 Saskatchewan Highway 49
 Saskatchewan Highway 648
 Saskatchewan Highway 661
 Saskatchewan Highway 753
 Saskatchewan Highway 980
 Canadian National Railway

See also 
List of rural municipalities in Saskatchewan

References 

Livingston

Division No. 9, Saskatchewan